Nicolai Riedel (born 17 October 1952 in Lübeck) is a German philologist, author and an editor. Riedel worked for a long time as a research fellow in the library of the German Literature Archive in Marbach am Neckar. In addition, he is the author and editor of numerous bibliographical publications. These include works on Uwe Johnson, Ernst Jünger and Günter Kunert.

Biography and work
Riedel first studied German and philosophy at the University of Mannheim. This was followed by academic teaching from 1980 to 1989 and his doctorate in modern German literature at the University of Passau. Between the years 1989 and 2017 he was a research fellow and head of the inventory and use department in the library of the German Literature Archive in Marbach, with a focus on the care of the special collections (poets and scholars' libraries, publisher's archives, topic- and author-specific bundles), inter-institutional lending and magazine logistics. In 2018 and 2019 he worked part-time in the literature archive and was responsible for the Marbach Schiller bibliography.

For many years, Riedel was co-editor of the literary magazine "Passauer Pegasus" and a member of the Mecklenburg Literature Society and the German Schiller Society.

Nicolai Riedel has lived in the baroque city of Ludwigsburg since 1989.

Publications (selection)

Publications 
 Untersuchungen zur internationalen Rezeption Uwe Johnsons. Olms, Hildesheim 1985, .
 Uwe-Johnson-Bibliographie 1959–1998. Metzler, Stuttgart 1999, .
 Ernst-Jünger-Bibliographie 1928–2002. Metzler, Stuttgart 2003, .
 Internationale Günter-Kunert-Bibliographie 1947–2011. de Gruyter, Berlin 2012, .
 Ernst-Jünger-Bibliographie 2003–2015. Metzler, Stuttgart 2016, .
 Bibliographisches Handbuch der deutschsprachigen Lyrik 1945–2020. Metzler, Heidelberg 2023, .

Publications (as editor) 
 Erzähltechnik und Entfremdungsproblematik. MWA, Mannheim 1977.
 Uwe Johnsons Frühwerk im Spiegel der deutschsprachigen Literaturkritik. Bouvier, Bonn 1987.
 with Carsten Gansel: Internationales Uwe-Johnson-Forum. 10 Bände, Lang, Frankfurt/M. 1990–2006.
 with Gerhard Nebel „Alles Gefühl ist leiblich". Ein Stück Autobiographie, Deutsche Schillergesellschaft, Marbach am Neckar 2003, .

Periodic publications 
 with Herman Moens: Marbacher Schiller-Bibliographie. Internationales Referenzorgan zur Forschungs- und Wirkungsgeschichte. In: Jahrbuch der Deutschen Schillergesellschaft, 2006–2018 (13 updates).

Other works (selection) 
 Numerous bibliographical articles in the periodical "Text + Kritik" and in the "KLG". Individual essays in scholarly collections.

References

External links 
 
 Nicolai Riedel in WorldCat
 Nicolai Riedel Profile in: Perlentaucher 

1952 births
Living people
People from Lübeck
University of Passau alumni
German philologists
German editors
German male non-fiction writers